National Road, also known as Peacock Road, is located off of U.S. Route 40 between Cambridge and Old Washington, Ohio. The road was placed on the National Register on 1985-08-23.

History
The National Road was authorized by President Thomas Jefferson on March 29, 1806 and reached out to Pittsburgh, Pennsylvania. The road was later expanded to stretch to Jefferson City, Missouri. The road closely followed Zane's Trace, an earlier path, and came through the Guernsey County area around 1838.

The road currently known as Peacock Road contains original brick sections of 1918 construction. However, due to costs, parts of the road were left unpaved until World War II, when the road was used for war shipment. Local inmates were used as a cost saving method to brick up the sections. When Route 40 was diverted north of this section, the old road was unknowingly saved for posterity.

Peacock Road
Part of the National Road in Center Township retains its early twentieth-century appearance. Virtually no changes have been made since the 1920s, including the pavement; the bricks laid in 1918 remain in place.

References

External links
 Guernsey County Tourism

Transportation in Guernsey County, Ohio
National Register of Historic Places in Guernsey County, Ohio
1806 establishments in Ohio
Roads on the National Register of Historic Places in Ohio